La Piedra Movediza was a balancing rock located in Tandil, Buenos Aires Province, Argentina. Its weight was about 300 tons. It attracted attention and tourists because of the way it was balanced on the edge of a hill. The stone fell and broke on 29 February 1912. Some sources say it fell due to vandalism or vibrations caused by explosions in a nearby quarry.

History
It was located on the top of La Movediza hill, at the coordinates .

It was particularly interesting not only because of the way it balanced on the face of the hill, but also because it rocked from morning to evening in a very slow fashion (imperceptible to the eye). People used to place glass bottles under the bottom of the massive rock only to see them smashed later in the day.

It fell and broke on 29 February 1912, between 5 and 6 p.m. As there were no witnesses, the true time and cause of the fall are unknown.

One theory for the cause of the fall was that the quarrymen were annoyed with the tourist visits to the place. Another possibility was that it fell due to vibrations from blasting of the bore in the quarries nearby. After the event, an eyewitness (the wife of the mine's manager) came forward to say that a group of people had been rocking the stone that afternoon. Its fall was probably eased by an 1848 lightning strike, which hit the stone and flaked off a portion of its mass. However, no official reason for its fall was ever issued.

Various proposals were floated to move the three segments of the broken stone to the hill and re-cement them into position, but nothing was agreed upon. In 2007 a copy of the stone was put in the same place where the original was situated, which is considered as a historical symbol of Tandil. This place was named "Parque Lítico La Movediza". The replica does not move, being securely fixed into the supporting rock.

References

Other sources
 Information about the rock (in Spanish).
 The Piedra Movediza falls (in Spanish) 

History of Buenos Aires Province
Rock formations of Argentina
Tourist attractions in Buenos Aires Province